The Secunderabad–Bolarum ( SB) is a suburban rail service of the Multi-Modal Transport System of Hyderabad, India. Spanning 11 stations, it runs between Secunderabad and Bolarum 5 times a day.

History 
The Secunderabad–Bolarum route is one of the oldest suburban rail in the city of Hyderabad, established by Nizam's Guaranteed State Railway. Initially, it was a metre-gauge track but was later converted into broad-gauge.

Stations

MMTS route 
Secunderabad–Bolarum route is scheduled to take off as a part of the phase 2 of the Hyderabad Multi-Modal Transport System in December 2018., however was delayed due to paucity of funds. The work of the section is nearing to completion in February 2020.

Electrification 
Railway electrification system of the 13km long route was  completed in 2018 by South Central Railway.

Image gallery

References

External links
MMTS Train Timings

Transport in Hyderabad, India
Hyderabad MMTS